Richard Hugh Cavendish, Baron Cavendish of Furness  (born 2 November 1941), is a British Conservative politician and landowner.

Lord Cavendish owns Holker Hall and its 17,000 acre estate overlooking Morecambe Bay in Cumbria. The property became part of this branch of the Cavendish family's inheritance via his grandfather, Lord Richard Cavendish CB.

Early life
Richard Hugh Cavendish was born as the second child and first son of Hon. Richard Edward Osborne Cavendish (1917–1972) and his wife, Pamela Thomas (b. 1918), daughter of Hugh Lloyd Thomas (1888–1938) and Hon. Gwendoline Ada Bellew (1891–1976), a great-granddaughter of Patrick Bellew, 1st Baron Bellew.

Biography
Educated at Eton College, he was created a life peer as Baron Cavendish of Furness, of Cartmel in the County of Cumbria, on the advice of Prime Minister Margaret Thatcher on 17 May 1990 and served as a lord-in-waiting (1990–92). He and his son, Hon. Freddy Cavendish, are in remainder to the dukedom of Devonshire.

Cavendish is the chairman of the Holker Estate Group and has chaired the Morecambe and Lonsdale Conservative Association (1975–78) and the board of governors of St Anne's School, Windermere (1983–89). He is a director of Nirex Ltd (since 1993) and served as High Sheriff of Cumbria (1978–79) and a member of the Cumbria County Council (1985–1990). He became president of the Dry Stone Walling Association of Great Britain in 2008. He is chairman of the Burlington Stone Company.

Cavendish is the president of South Cumbria Rivers Trust.

Marriage
In 1970 Cavendish married Grania Mary Caulfeild (b. 1947), granddaughter of Sir William Lindsay Murphy, who served as British Governor of the Bahamas. They have one son, the Hon. Frederick Cavendish and two daughters, the Hon. Lucy Cavendish and the Hon. Emily Cavendish. They have four grandchildren.

Arms

See also
 Cavendish family

References

External links

 
 www.william1.co.uk
 Burke's Peerage & Baronetage
 Lancashire Life

1941 births
Living people
People from Cumbria
People educated at Eton College
English businesspeople
Hugh, Baron Cavendish of Furness
High Sheriffs of Cumbria
Members of Cumbria County Council
Deputy Lieutenants in England
Conservative Party (UK) Baronesses- and Lords-in-Waiting
Conservative Party (UK) life peers
Life peers created by Elizabeth II